The 113th Infantry were an infantry regiment of the British Indian Army. The regiment traces their origins to 1800, when they were raised as the 1st Battalion, 7th Regiment of Bombay Native Infantry.

The regiment's first action was in Egypt during the Battle of Alexandria part of the French Revolutionary Wars. They then took part in the Battle of Khadki in the Third Anglo-Maratha War. They were then used in the punitive expedition in the Beni Boo Ali campaign in 1821, against the pirates in Eastern Arabia and the Persian Gulf. They next took part in the central Indian campaign after the Indian Rebellion of 1857. During World War I they were attached to the 17th Indian Division for the Mesopotamia Campaign. They took part in the action at Fat-ha Gorge on the Little Zab and the Battle of Sharqat, in October 1918.

After World War I the Indian government reformed the army moving from single battalion regiments to multi battalion regiments. In 1922, the 113th Infantry became the 6th Battalion 4th Bombay Grenadiers. After independence they were one of the regiments allocated to the Indian Army.

Predecessor names 
1st Battalion, 7th Regiment of Bombay Native Infantry - 1800
13th Bombay Native Infantry - 1824
13th Bombay Infantry - 1885
113th Infantry - 1903

References

Sources

Moberly, F.J. (1923). Official History of the War: Mesopotamia Campaign, Imperial War Museum. 

British Indian Army infantry regiments
Bombay Presidency
Military units and formations established in 1800
Military units and formations disestablished in 1922